Por el mismo camino ("On the Same Road") is a 1953 Mexican film starring Sara García.

External links
 

1953 films
1950s Spanish-language films
Mexican black-and-white films
1950s Mexican films